Lancun Subdistrict is a subdistrict in Jimo District, Qingdao, Shandong province, China. , it has six neighborhoods and 52 villages under its administration: 
Neighborhoods
Jiangjiawuzi
Xinjiawuzi
Xinli
Qiaoxitou
Yanghui Road Community
Zhenghe Road Community

Villages
Sanli Village
Sili Village
Yili Village
Erli Village
Guojiazhuang Village
Guojiawuzi Village
Daoxiang Village
Guajiawuzi Village
Wangjiawuzi Village
Xiaoguanzhuang Village
Daguanzhuang Village
Lujiabu Village
Bozi Village
Houbaita Village
Qianbaita Village
Jiagezhuang Village
Chenghou Village
Gucheng Village
Liuli Village
Wuli Village
Nanquan Village
Beiquan Village
Quandong Village
Qiaogezhuang Village
Qianbutou Village
Houbutou Village
Luanbu Village
Zhujiaguanzhuang Village
Dabuhou Village
Xiaobuhou Village
Dongshiyuzhuang Village
Xishiyuzhuang Village
Wangyanzhuangnan Village
Wangyanzhuangbei Village
Wangyanzhuangdong Village
Wangjiaxiaoqiao Village
Nanhaojiatun Village
Nuochengwang Village
Nuochengliu Village
Nuochengsong Village
Nuochengfan Village
Nuochenghenan Village
Beihaojiatun Village
Xincheng Village
Daijiazhuang Village
Fangoutuan Village
Majiatun Village
Zhaojiatun Village
Qingyutun Village
Wangjiaxinzhuang Village
Cuijiawuzi Village
Wushan Village

See also 
 List of township-level divisions of Shandong

References 

Township-level divisions of Shandong
Geography of Qingdao
Subdistricts of the People's Republic of China